The 1881 Nelson by-election was a by-election held on 7 June 1881 in the  electorate during the 7th New Zealand Parliament. The "show of hands" had favoured Richmond (31 to 24).

The by-election was caused by the resignation of the incumbent MP Acton Adams. The by-election was won by Henry Levestam. Richmond was regarded as the Government nominee.

Results
The following table gives the election result:

References

Nelson 1881
1881 elections in New Zealand
Politics of Nelson, New Zealand